Heterostemma is a genus of plants in the family Apocynaceae, first described in 1834. It is native to India, China, Taiwan, Southeast Asia, Australia, and certain islands in the Pacific.

Species
The Plant List categorizes many species names in Heterostemma as "unresolved," i.e., of uncertain affinity. The following are accepted:

References

Apocynaceae genera
Asclepiadoideae